The women's singles of the 2009 ECM Prague Open tournament was played on clay in Prague, Czech Republic.

Vera Zvonareva was the defending champion, but was sidelined due to an ankle injury.

Sybille Bammer won in the final 7-6(4), 6-2 against Francesca Schiavone.

Seeds

Draw

Finals

Top half

Bottom half

External links
Main Draw
Qualifying Draw

ECM Prague Open - Singles
2009 - Singles